Pareiorhaphis garbei, sometimes known by its associated L-number, LDA-090, is a species of catfish in the family Loricariidae. It is native to South America, where it occurs in the basins of the Macaé River and the Macacu River in the vicinity of Serra dos Órgãos National Park in Brazil. The species reaches 14 cm (5.5 inches) in total length and is believed to be a facultative air-breather.

References 

Fish described in 1911
Catfish of South America
Loricariidae
Freshwater fish of Brazil
Taxa named by Hermann von Ihering